Ali Cafer Çağatay (1899 – 24 April 1991) was a Turkish football player. He played as a left back for Fenerbahçe, Altınordu İdman Yurdu SK and the Turkey national football team. He was born in Kadıköy, Istanbul.

Career

Çağatay played for Fenerbahçe in 1915-16 before joining Altınordu İdman Yurdu SK, with whom he won the 1916–17 and 1917-18 Istanbul Football League Championships. In 1922 he rejoined Fenerbahçe, playing for the club until 1927. With Fenerbahçe he won the 1922-23 Istanbul Football League Championship and the General Harington Cup.

National team
He was included in the first squad of the Turkey national football team, who played against Romania on 26 October 1923. He played 7 times for the national team, and represented his country at the 1924 Summer Olympics.

Personal life
Çağatay graduated from Saint Joseph High School and Istanbul University, Faculty of Pharmacy. He was the son of Turkish composer, oud virtuoso, and academic Ali Rıfat Çağatay who arranged the Turkish National Anthem.

References

External links

1899 births
1991 deaths
Footballers from Istanbul
Turkish footballers
Turkey international footballers
Association football defenders
Fenerbahçe S.K. footballers
Fenerbahçe S.K. board members
Istanbul University alumni
Olympic footballers of Turkey
Footballers at the 1924 Summer Olympics
St. Joseph High School Istanbul alumni